Chionochloa flavescens, known as broad-leaved snow tussock or haumata in Māori. Endemic to New Zealand, there are several different sub species that look very similar. The leaves which are up to one centimetre wide is larger than most tussocks similar to it. The flower-plumes of about 30 cm appear around December/January and are quite open compared to C. conspicua and C. flavicans.

Subspecies
The four subspecies are subsp. flavescens, subsp. brevis, subsp. hirta and subsp. lupeola.

The most commonly cultivated form is ssp. brevis from the South Island.

References

flavescens
Bunchgrasses of Australasia
Endemic flora of New Zealand
Grasses of New Zealand
Flora of the North Island
Flora of the South Island